Amanah Ikhtiar Malaysia (AIM) is Malaysia's largest microcredit organization. Since its inception in 1987, it has disbursed more than RM2.3 billion in loans to 262,000 borrowers.

AIM claims to have the world's highest repayment rate, at 99.2%.
The Asian Institute of Finance has produced a case study on AIM detailing its achievements since 1987 inception.

References

External links
AIM Website
 http://www.grameen-info.org/

1987 establishments in Malaysia
Microfinance organizations
Privately held companies of Malaysia